Down in a Mirror: A Second Tribute to Jandek is a tribute album compiled by Moscow, PA-based independent record label Summersteps Records, released as a follow-up to the label's first Jandek tribute, Naked in the Afternoon. As with Naked in the Afternoon, Down In A Mirror features cover versions of songs by the reclusive avant-folk/blues singer/songwriter Jandek. Some of the artists are members of the Summersteps roster or fans forming one-time combos to participate on the album, but the album also features contributions from Wilco's Jeff Tweedy, Six Organs of Admittance (reportedly a favorite modern act of Jandek's, according to the "unauthorized" Texas Monthly interview), The Mountain Goats, Kawabata Makoto of Acid Mothers Temple, Lewis & Clarke and Okkervil River.

All of the songs are covers of songs from Jandek's back catalog, with the exception of the contribution by the act Dirty Projectors, an original song called "With U Icon (An Homage)". As with the first Summersteps-led tribute album, Jandek gave full permission to cover his material through his Corwood Industries label and, at Summersteps' request, contributed some photographs taken by the singer/songwriter for the CD's cover art that emulates Jandek's own record/CD releases.

The recording, compilation, and release of Down In A Mirror came in the wake of both the acclaimed documentary Jandek on Corwood and Jandek's own sudden surprise foray into live performance, and as a result gained more attention than the original tribute album.

Three of the songs on the compilation, "Nancy Sings", "Babe I Love You", and "Cave In On You", were also covered on Naked in the Afternoon five years earlier, and two songs, "You Painted Your Teeth" and "Babe I Love You" are covered twice (in different arrangements) on this album - a slight curiosity given the fact that at the time the last contribution to this album was finished in February 2005, Corwood Industries had released over 40 albums of Jandek material.

Track listing
"Crack a Smile" (from Lost Cause) – 3:35
Performed by Jeff Tweedy (of Wilco).
"You Painted Your Teeth" (from Telegraph Melts) – 2:36
Performed by Live Show Rabbits
"The Dunes" (from Worthless Recluse) – 2:04
Performed by Eric Gaffney
"Your Other Man" (from Blue Corpse) – 5:17
Performed by Okkervil River
"Message to the Clerk" (from On The Way) – 3:43
Performed by Brother JT
"I'll Sit Alone and Think a lot About You" (from On the Way) – 4:31
Performed by Six Organs of Admittance
"Cave in on You/European Jewel" (Incomplete) (both from Ready for the House) – 5:06
Performed by Home for the Def
"Down in a Mirror" (from Chair Beside a Window) – 3:34
Performed by The Marshmallow Staircase
"White Box" (from White Box Requiem) – 2:51
Performed by The Mountain Goats
"Aimless Breeze" (from Worthless Recluse) – 2:40
Performed by George Parsons
"Nancy Sings" (from Chair Beside a Window) – 4:47
Performed by Lewis & Clarke
"Naked in the Afternoon" (from Ready for the House) – 2:45
Performed by Jack Norton
"Sung" (from Interstellar Discussion) – 1:46
Performed by Rivulets
"Babe I Love You" (from Lost Cause) – 4:31
Performed by Kawabata Makoto
"The Spirit" (from Interstellar Discussion) – 4:01
Performed by Wayside Drive
"Just Die" (from I Woke Up) – 6:48
Performed by a Real Knife Head
"Van Nuys Mission" (from Glad to Get Away) – 2:51
Performed by Ross Beach
"I Found the Right Change" (from The Gone Wait) – 1:46
Performed by Multi-Panel
"Babe I Love You" (from Lost Cause) – 2:44
Performed by Dan Melchior
"You Painted Your Teeth" (from Telegraph Melts) – 4:09
Performed by Pothole Skinny
"With U Icon" (An Homage) (Dog Longneck) – 5:09
Performed by Dirty Projectors

Personnel 

Ted Baird – design, layout design
Ross Beach – instrumentation
Brother JT – instrumentation
Dan Burton – engineer
Jessica Cowley – engineer
Jordan Geiger – piano, keyboards
Gary Pig Gold – liner notes
Michael Kapinus – bass
Kawabata Makoto – vocals, hurdygurdy
Dan Melchior – instrumentation
The Mountain Goats – guitar, vocals
Travis Nelsen – drums
Jack Norton – guitar, vocals, engineer
George Parsons – vocals
Rivulets – instrumentation
Will Sheff – acoustic guitar, vocals
Jeff Tweedy – bass, guitar, vocals, mellotron
Jason Woods – drums
Executive producer: Eric Schlittler
Layout and design: Ted Baird
Mastering: Dan McKinney

References 

2005 albums
Summersteps Records albums
Jandek tribute albums